The hangings at Battleford refers to the hanging on November 27, 1885, of eight Indigenous men for murders committed in the North-West Rebellion. The executed men were found guilty of murder in the Frog Lake Massacre and in the Looting of Battleford. These murders took place outside the military combat that took place during the North-West Rebellion. 

The court trials were presided over by magistrate Charles Rouleau. The trials and hangings followed the Looting of Battleford, where the judge himself suffered material loss. 

Prior to the rebellion the Canadian government's actions in the District of Saskatchewan resulted in starvation, disease, and death among the Indigenous peoples of the area. Traditional means of self-support, such as buffalo disappeared with the sale of lands.
 
At both Frog Lake and Battleford, some people took up arms against the wishes of their leaders. Some were sentenced to prison terms or death. Others fled to the United States.

Trial and charges of bias 

In the Frog Lake Massacre, Indian Agent Thomas Trueman Quinn was shot in the head. Quinn was a notoriously harsh Indian agent, who kept Indigenous people near Frog Lake on the brink of starvation ("no work, no rations"). Quinn treated the Cree with harshness and arrogance. Before dawn on April 2, 1885, a party of Cree warriors captured Quinn at his home. He refused to go to another location with the Cree warriors, and Wandering Spirit shot him dead. In the moments of panic following Quinn's shooting, eight other settler prisoners were shot dead. 

Following the end of the rebellion, marked by the capture of Batoche, the participants of the events at Frog Lake were arrested and taken to Battleford. 

Wandering Spirit pleaded guilty and was sentenced to hang on September 22, 1885. 

The major trial condemning six of the eight men to death by hanging was heard by a Battleford resident, Stipendiary Magistrate Charles Rouleau. The December issue of the Saskatchewan Herald described him as a "heavy loser pecuniarily" after the Looting of Battleford  his house had been burned to the ground, and he reportedly threatened that "every Indian and Half-breed and rebel brought before him after the insurrection was suppressed, would be sent to the gallows if possible." 

Rouleau found 11 of the accused men guilty and sentenced them to hang. 

The Cree-speaking men who were sentenced to hang were not provided with translation at their trial.

The death sentences for three were commuted before their sentences could be carried out.

The eight hanged 
The following people were sentenced to die in Battleford. The first six were convicted of murders in the Frog Lake Massacre, while the final two were convicted of murders in the Looting of Battleford. 
 Kah - Paypamahchukways (Wandering Spirit) for the murder of T. T. Quinn, Indian Agent.
 Pah Pah-Me-Kee-Sick (Round the Sky) for the murder of Léon Fafard, a priest of the Oblates of Mary Immaculate.
 Manchoose (Bad Arrow) for the murder of Charles Govin, Quinn's interpreter.
 Kit-Ahwah-Ke-Ni (Miserable Man) for the murder of Govin.
 Nahpase (Iron Body) for the murder of George Dill, a free trader.
 A-Pis-Chas-Koos (Little Bear) for the murder of Dill.
 Itka (Crooked Leg) for the murder of Payne, a farm instructor of the Stoney Reserve south of Battleford.
 Waywahnitch (Man Without Blood) for the murder of Tremont, a rancher out of Battleford.

Hangings 
There are a number of first-hand historical records that exist of the Hangings at Battleford. The majority of accounts are written from the perspective of settlers in the area. Blood Red the Sun, a work by William Bleasdell Cameron, first published in 1926 as The War Trail of Big Bear, describes the events leading up to the Frog Lake Massacre and the executions in significant detail. Cameron's friends and colleagues were killed at the Frog Lake Massacre, and he was an HBC employee whose life was spared by Wandering Spirit. Cameron testified at the trials against the accused men.

Students from Battleford Industrial School were brought from the school to witness the hangings as a "warning".

Historical significance 
In his 1970s-era histographical account of Indian policy in Canada, Prisons of Grass, Howard Adams gives his opinion on the hangings:

Rediscovery of the gravesite

The bodies were buried in a mass grave near the fort. It remained unmarked and forgotten for many years. In 1972, the gravesite was rediscovered by students who followed old plans of the fort to find the burial. The location was marked with a concrete pad and chain fence. In later years, this was removed and replaced with a modern headstone bearing the names of the executed men. There is also an interpretive panel explaining the history of the burial site.

The gravesite is located on public property in the Town of Battleford at  near the Eiling Kramer Campground and Fort Battleford.

References